Matrox Simple Interface (in short MSI) is the name of a proprietary DOS and Windows 95 application programming interface for Matrox Mystique graphics cards made by Matrox. MSI API supported a maximum of 640x480x16 resolution with z-buffer and no bilinear filtering. It used color look up tables to save memory. When Matrox released the Matrox m3D (using the PowerVR PCX2 chipset), MSI was completely abandoned.

Sources
https://web.archive.org/web/20110807162742/http://www.forums.murc.ws/archive/index.php/t-38427.html Legacy Matrox-enhanced games on g200/g400 [Archive] - MURC
http://www.geocities.com/k_lupinsky/Mystique.htm Kanajana's MechWarrior 2 3D Page - Matrox Mystique Edition
http://www.unet.univie.ac.at/~a0503736/php/drdoswiki/index.php?n=Main.Hardware Club Dr-DOS Wiki

Graphics cards
3D graphics APIs